The Church of Saint Casimir is a Roman Catholic church building built in 1904 in the Beaux-Arts style in Saint Paul, Minnesota, United States. It is listed on the National Register of Historic Places. The church was founded to serve the needs of Polish American immigrants.

References

External links

Official website

Beaux-Arts architecture in Minnesota
Roman Catholic churches in Saint Paul, Minnesota
National Register of Historic Places in Saint Paul, Minnesota
Polish-American culture in Minnesota
Churches on the National Register of Historic Places in Minnesota
Roman Catholic churches completed in 1904
20th-century Roman Catholic church buildings in the United States